Lieutenant General Edward Charles Cardon (born November 16, 1960) is a retired senior officer in the United States Army who last served as the director of the United States Army Office of Business Transformation and before that as former commander of the Second United States Army/United States Army Cyber Command.

Military career
Cardon received his commission upon his graduation from the United States Military Academy in 1982.  Upon his entry into service he was commissioned as an engineer officer.  During his tenure Cardon has held commands at every organizational level of the Army, ranging from platoon, division, field army, and component command.  Cardon has also served as commander of the Engineer Brigade, 3rd Infantry Division, the first commanding officer of the newly reorganized 4th Brigade Combat Team, 3rd Infantry Division, the Deputy Commandant, US Army Command and General Staff College, and the commanding officer of 2nd Infantry Division.  Cardon took command of United States Army Cyber Command on September 2, 2013, taking over for retiring Lieutenant General Rhett A. Hernandez.  Cardon was given command of the Second Army upon its reactivation on March 6, 2014 when the positions of commander of US Army Cyber Command and commander of the Second Army were dual hatted.  While head of US Army Cyber Command, Cardon was tasked with setting up cyber protection teams to protect Army systems and network from intrusions as well as moving the Army to a "more defensible platform".

Cardon served as commander of US Army Cyber Command and the 2nd Army until October 14, 2016 when he was succeeded as commanding officer by Lieutenant General Paul M. Nakasone upon his was appointment as chief of the United States Army Office of Business Transformation.  In addition to receiving his bachelor's degree from the United States Military Academy at West Point, Cardon has also attended the National War College where he received a MS in National Security and Strategic Studies and the United States Naval Command and Staff College where he received a second Master of Science in National Security Strategic Studies.

As DIROBT, Cardon was tasked by the army's top officer to review the problem and devise ways to strengthen the senior officer corps.

Awards and decorations

Personal
Cardon is the son of Lawrence Edward Cardon and Cornelia Helen (Overdevest) Cardon. He is married and has three children.

References

1960 births
Living people
United States Military Academy alumni
College of Naval Command and Staff alumni
National War College alumni
Recipients of the Legion of Merit
United States Army generals
Recipients of the Defense Superior Service Medal